Thierry Vigneron (born 9 March 1960 in Gennevilliers, Hauts-de-Seine) is a retired French pole vaulter. In the 1980s, he was among the world's leading pole vaulters.  He broke the world record in the event four times and was the last man to hold the world record (for only a few minutes in August 1984) before Sergey Bubka, who would hold on to it almost 30 years until February 2014.

Biography
Vigneron burst onto the world stage by unexpectedly beating the 5.72 m outdoor world record of Poland's Władysław Kozakiewicz with a jump of 5.75 m on 1 June 1980. Vigneron equaled his own outdoor world record of 5.75 m on 29 June 1980. Although Vigneron lost his outdoor world record to another Frenchman, Philippe Houvion, on 17 July 1980, he was one of the favorites at the 1980 Summer Olympics.  However, Vigneron could not rise to the challenge; he could only finish in 7th position at 5.45 m. The 1980 Olympics pole vault title was won by Kozakiewicz, who also reclaimed the outdoor world record from Houvion with a jump of 5.78 m in that Olympic final. On 20 June 1981 Vigneron reclaimed the outdoor world record with a 5.80 m jump, only to lose it to the Soviet Union's Vladimir Polyakov six days later.

After yet another Frenchman, Pierre Quinon, raised the outdoor world record to 5.82 m on 28 August 1983, Vigneron vaulted to another outdoor world record again with 5.83 m on 1 September 1983. This record remained unbeaten until 26 May 1984, when Sergey Bubka cleared 5.85 m just weeks before the 1984 Summer Olympics in Los Angeles, in which Vigneron took the bronze medal while Bubka was absent due to the Soviet-led boycott.  On 31 August 1984, less than three weeks after the 1984 Olympics had ended, Bubka beat Vigneron in a memorable contest in Rome in which the Frenchman briefly retook the outdoor world record with 5.91 m and the Ukrainian cleared 5.94 m immediately afterwards. It was the last time that anyone other than Bubka held the outdoor world record.  (Bubka continued to hold the outdoor world record until September 17, 2020 with a  6.14m mark). However, Bubka's indoor world record of 6.15m was previously beaten by another Frenchman, Renaud Lavillenie, who vaulted 6.16m, on February 15, 2014.  Ironically, both marks were set in Donetsk, Ukraine, which is Bubka's hometown.)

This was the high-water mark of Vigneron's career. Despite a bronze medal at the 1984 Summer Olympics, a silver medal at the World Indoor Championships in 1985, a bronze medal at the World Indoor Championships in 1987, and a silver medal at the 1987 World Championships in Rome, Vigneron was never able again to match Bubka who brought the outdoor world record to its present-day mark of 6.14 m.

Vigneron retired from pole vaulting in 1996.

International competitions

1No mark in the final

See also
 French all-time top lists - Pole vault
 Men's pole vault world record progression

External links
 
 IAAF profile of Thierry Vigneron

1960 births
Living people
People from Gennevilliers
French male pole vaulters
Athletes (track and field) at the 1980 Summer Olympics
Athletes (track and field) at the 1984 Summer Olympics
Athletes (track and field) at the 1988 Summer Olympics
Olympic athletes of France
Olympic bronze medalists for France
World record setters in athletics (track and field)
World Athletics Championships medalists
World Athletics Championships athletes for France
Medalists at the 1984 Summer Olympics
Olympic bronze medalists in athletics (track and field)
Mediterranean Games silver medalists for France
Athletes (track and field) at the 1993 Mediterranean Games
Universiade medalists in athletics (track and field)
Sportspeople from Hauts-de-Seine
Mediterranean Games medalists in athletics
Universiade silver medalists for France
World Athletics Indoor Championships medalists
Medalists at the 1983 Summer Universiade